was a  originally built as , one of three s built in Japan during the late 1930s. She was transferred to the Imperial Japanese Navy (IJN) during the Pacific War, renamed, and was converted into an escort carrier in 1942. The ship spent most of her service ferrying aircraft, cargo and passengers to various bases in the Pacific. Un'yō was badly damaged by an American submarine in early 1944. After repairs were completed in June, the ship resumed transporting aircraft and cargo. During a return voyage from Singapore in September, she was sunk by the submarine .

Construction and civilian service

Yawata Maru was the second of three ships of the Nitta Maru-class and was built by Mitsubishi Shipbuilding & Engineering Co. at their Nagasaki shipyard for Nippon Yusen Kaisha (NYK). She was laid down on 14 December 1938 as yard number 751, launched on 31 October 1939 and completed on 31 July 1940. The IJN subsidized all three Nitta Maru-class ships for possible conversion into auxiliary aircraft carriers. The ships were intended for service to Europe, but the start of World War II in September 1939 restricted them to the Pacific.

She had a net tonnage of 9,379. The ship was powered by two sets of geared steam turbines, each driving one propeller shaft, using steam produced by four water-tube boilers.

Conversion
The ship was requisitioned by the IJN in October 1941 and was initially used to transport prisoners of war. Between 25 November and 31 May 1942, Yawata Maru was converted into an escort carrier at Kure Naval Arsenal and she was renamed Un'yō on 31 August.

Un'yō could accommodate a total of 30 aircraft, including spares, although no arresting gear was fitted.

Un'yōs crew totaled 850 officers and enlisted men.

The ship was equipped with eight  Type 89 dual-purpose guns in four twin mounts on sponsons along the sides of the hull. Her light anti-aircraft armament consisted of eight  Type 96 light anti-aircraft (AA) guns in four twin-gun mounts, also in sponsons along the sides of the hull. In early 1943, the four twin 2.5 cm mounts were replaced by triple mounts and four additional triple mounts were added. She also received a Type 21 early-warning radar in a retractable installation on the flight deck at that time. The following year, Un'yōs light AA armament was increased to a total of 64 weapons.

Operational history
Un'yō made three voyages from Japan to Truk, Saipan, and Rabaul between July and October 1942, during which she delivered 10 Mitsubishi A6M Zero fighters to the latter on 11 September. Her next trip was far more involved as she ferried aircraft between Truk, the Philippines, Palau and the Dutch East Indies. The ship departed Yokosuka on 28 October and picked up the 11th Fighter Regiment at Surabaya, Java, on 2 December and delivered them to Truk on 11 days later. Un'yō returned to Surabaya on 24 December and loaded 33 aircraft of the Imperial Japanese Army Air Force's (IJAAF) 1st Fighter Regiment for delivery to Truk before finally returning to Yokosuka in early January 1943.

After a brief refit in Yokohama, the ship loaded 36 Kawasaki Ki-48 "Lily" bombers of the IJAAF's 208th Light Bomber Regiment on 1 February and delivered them to Truk on the 7th. Both submarines claimed hits on Un'yō and Aikoku Maru, but only the latter ship was actually struck by a single torpedo.

The carrier continued her transport missions between Japan and Truk for the rest of the year, with a brief refit at the Kure Naval Arsenal from 30 September to 9 October. On 30 November, she departed Truk in company with her sister Chūyō and the light carrier  ; the carriers were escorted by the heavy cruiser  and four destroyers. Chūyō and Un'yō had aboard 21 and 20 captured crewmen from the sunken submarine , respectively. The detonation blew off her bow and caused the forward part of the flight deck to collapse. To reduce pressure on the interior bulkheads, the ship's captain began steaming in reverse at half speed towards Yokosuka. She was again torpedoed by Sailfish at 05:55, this time twice in the port engine room. The hits disabled her engines and Maya and one destroyer came alongside to render assistance. Un'yō was ordered to take her sister in tow, but was then told to continue onwards to Yokosuka. The ship was transferred from the Combined Fleet to the Grand Escort Command on 5 December, it made no appreciable difference to her duties as the ship continued to ferry aircraft and supplies to Truk.

Her bow was heavily damaged by them and sagged downwards. While sheltering at Garapan Anchorage, Saipan, to conduct emergency repairs, a follow-up attack by Halibut on 23 January was driven off. The convoy encountered a bad storm two days later and part of her damaged bow snapped off, causing the forepart of the flight deck to collapse. To prevent further damage, Un'yō began to steam stern-first and arrived at Yokosuka on the 8th to begin permanent repairs that were completed by 28 June.

After working up, the ship was assigned to the 1st Surface Escort Force on 14 August. She departed Moji-ku, Kitakyūshū, Japan, on 25 August as part of the escort for Convoy HI-73, together with the anti-submarine cruiser  and six other escorts. Un'yō carried ten Nakajima B5N "Kate" torpedo bombers and six Kawasaki Ki-3 biplane training aircraft of the 91st Squadron on this voyage. The convoy arrived in Singapore on 25 August.

The same group of escorts protected Convoy HI-74 as it departed Singapore on 11 September.
A storm developed during the night and the force of the waves pounding on the carrier's stern collapsed the interior bulkheads despite them having been shored up. By 07:30, Un'yō had a large list to starboard and the crew was ordered to abandon ship. The number of people lost is not known with any precision as sources differ in the number of passengers that were aboard the ship. Un'yō reported that she had a complement of 45 officers and 781 crewmen aboard, but some sources say that she had a total of about 1,000 crew and passengers aboard. Other sources say that she had approximately 1,000 passengers of whom 800 died.

Notes

Footnotes

References
 
 
 
 
 
 
 
 

Taiyō-class escort carriers
Un'yō
1939 ships
World War II escort carriers of Japan
Ships sunk by American submarines
World War II shipwrecks in the Pacific Ocean
Maritime incidents in September 1944